Milena Gabanelli (born 9 June 1954 in Nibbiano) is an Italian journalist and television host, better known in Italy for the investigative journalism Television program Report. The program is currently broadcast by the Italian public TV channel Rai 3.

In 2013 Gabanelli declined a nomination as candidate in the 2013 election for the Italian Presidency, which had been proposed by Beppe Grillo's Five Star party. Milena Gabanelli left RAI on November 15, 2017. She currently collaborates with Corriere della Sera and the private TV station La7.

References

1954 births
Living people
Italian journalists
Italian women journalists
Investigative journalists
People from the Province of Piacenza